Mystacophorus mystax is a species of beetle in the family Cerambycidae, and the only species in the genus Mystacophorus. It was described by Duvivier in 1891.

References

Astathini
Beetles described in 1891
Monotypic beetle genera